Daniel Martins Guimarães (born 18 April 1987) is a Brazilian professional footballer who plays as a goalkeeper.

Professional career
Guimarães made his professional debut with América Mineiro in a 1-0 Campeonato Brasileiro Série C win over Mixto on 27 June 2009. He spent most of his early career in Brazil, before transferring to Portuguese club Nacional in 2017.

Guimarães was forced to suspend his career late in 2022 due to health issues.

Honours
América Mineiro

·Brazilian championship C: 2009

Nacional

·Ligapro :, 2017-18

·PRÊMIOS INDIVIDUAIS:

2ª Liga Portuguesa: Melhor G. Redes

References

External links

Daniel Guimarães at playmakerstats.com (English version of ogol.com.br)

1987 births
Living people
Sportspeople from Minas Gerais
Brazilian footballers
Association football goalkeepers
Primeira Liga players
Liga Portugal 2 players
Campeonato de Portugal (league) players
Campeonato Brasileiro Série A players
Campeonato Brasileiro Série B players
Campeonato Brasileiro Série C players
C.D. Nacional players
Red Bull Brasil players
América Futebol Clube (RN) players
Associação Atlética Ponte Preta players
Mogi Mirim Esporte Clube players
América Futebol Clube (MG) players
Brazilian expatriate footballers
Brazilian expatriates in Portugal
Expatriate footballers in Portugal